Lucy Wood may refer to:

 Lucy Wood (journalist), British fashion journalist
 Lucy Wood (field hockey) (born 1994), British field hockey player